The Rainmaker is a 1995 novel by John Grisham, his sixth.

Plot 
Rudy Baylor is about to graduate from Memphis State Law School. He secures a position with a Memphis law firm but loses the job when the firm is bought out by the large Memphis law firm Tinley Britt. As one of the few members of his class without a job lined up, a desperate Rudy is introduced to J. Lyman "Bruiser" Stone, a ruthless but successful ambulance chaser, who makes him an associate. To earn his fee, Rudy is required to hunt for potential clients at the local hospital and sign them up to personal injury lawsuits. He is introduced to Deck Shifflet, a less-than-ethical former insurance assessor who received a law degree but doesn't practice law, having failed to pass the bar exam six times.

Rudy signs two clients. One is his new elderly landlady, who needs a revised will drawn. The other is a poor family, Dot and Buddy Black, whose insurance bad faith case could be worth several million dollars in damages. With Stone's firm about to be raided by the police and the FBI, Rudy and Deck set up their own practice and file suit on behalf of the Blacks, whose leukemia-stricken son, Donny Ray, could have been saved by a bone marrow transplant for which his identical twin brother is a perfect match. The procedure should have been covered and paid for by their insurance carrier, Great Benefit Life Insurance, but the claim was instead denied.

Rudy, having just passed his bar exam, has never argued a case before a judge or jury. He now finds himself up against experienced and ruthless lawyers from Tinley Britt, headed by Leo F. Drummond. On his side, Rudy has several supporters and a sympathetic, newly-appointed judge. While preparing the case in the local hospital, he meets and later falls in love with Kelly Riker, a young battered wife recovering from injuries inflicted by her husband Cliff.

Donny Ray dies just before the case goes to trial. Rudy uncovers a scheme by Great Benefit to deny every insurance claim submitted, regardless of validity. Great Benefit was playing the odds that the insured would not consult an attorney. A former employee of Great Benefit testifies that the scheme generated an extra $40 million in revenue for the company. The trial ends with a plaintiff's judgment of $50.2 million. Great Benefit quickly declares itself bankrupt, thus allowing it to avoid paying the judgment. This leads to a series of lawsuits which forces Great Benefit out of business. Ultimately, there is no payout for the grieving parents and no fee for Rudy, although Dot was never concerned with the settlement money, because for her helping to put the company out of business is an even greater victory.

During the Black trial, when Kelly is beaten again by Cliff, Rudy helps her file for divorce. While he and Kelly retrieve items from her home, Cliff arrives and threatens to kill Rudy, attacking him with a baseball bat. Rudy wrestles the bat away from Cliff and cracks his skull with it. Kelly intervenes and orders him to leave. Cliff dies from the injuries and Kelly allows herself to be charged with manslaughter to protect Rudy. Rudy gets the charges dropped, but Cliff's vengeful family have made several death threats against them both. Rudy and Kelly leave the state, heading for someplace where Rudy – who has become disillusioned with the law – can become a teacher, and Kelly can attend college.

Reception
The Los Angeles Times called the book "an indictment of the legal system from law school to the jury’s verdict." Entertainment Weekly wrote that "if The Rainmaker’s outcome is a bit predictable, Grisham’s vivid minor characters and near-Dickensian zeal for mocking pomposity and privilege are apt to endear him to his many readers all over again." Publishers Weekly wrote that "this bittersweet tale, the author's quietest and most thoughtful, shows that Grisham's imagination can hold its own in a courtroom as well as on the violent streets outside."

The book sold 300,000 copies in its first four days, one of the fastest selling novels in history at the time.

In an interview with Time Magazine, John Grisham said that Rudy Baylor is the one protagonist from all his novels that he would like to be the most.

Film adaptation
In 1997, The Rainmaker was adapted into a film directed by Francis Ford Coppola and starring Matt Damon, Danny DeVito, Claire Danes, Jon Voight, and Danny Glover.

References

1995 American novels
Novels by John Grisham
Legal thriller novels
American novels adapted into films
Novels set in Memphis, Tennessee
Doubleday (publisher) books